The discography of American recording artist Marcella Detroit consists of seven studio albums, two compilation albums, sixteen singles (including three as a featured artist), and ten other appearances. Detroit released her debut studio album Marcella in 1982 under her birth name Marcy Levy, which went largely unnoticed. She became a member of pop group Shakespears Sister in 1989, who released two studio albums in her time with the band, the second, Hormonally Yours, peaked at No. 3 on the UK Albums Chart, and was certified double platinum by the BPI. After leaving the band in 1993, Detroit released her second studio album Jewel in March 1994, which peaked at No. 15 on the UK Albums Chart, and was certified silver. The album's lead single, "I Believe", peaked at No. 11 in the UK, and reached the top ten in Australia. Her following album Feeler, released in September 1996, was less successful, although it reached No. 82 in Japan. A live album, Without Medication Plus MTV "Buzz Live" was released promotionally in Japan the same year. Detroit's first EP, Abfab Songs, was released in 1999, consisting entirely of original songs featured on Absolutely Fabulous in 1996, when Detroit guest-starred in two episodes as an angel. The same year, she released Demoz, a double-CD collection of demos through her website. Her fourth studio album Dancing Madly Sideways was released in the same fashion, and thus did not chart in any territories.

In 2002, Detroit formed a self-titled blues band, the Marcy Levy Band, who released their debut EP Button Fly Blues in 2003, followed by a full studio album The Upside of Being Down in 2006. The band broke up sometime in 2007–2008. Detroit released a Christmas EP, Happy Holiday in 2011, followed by a second holiday EP Holiday 2012 a year after. She released her fifth studio album, The Vehicle, in April 2013 through Right Recordings, her first solo album in 12 years. Her sixth studio album, and her first holiday album, For the Holidays, was released in November 2013, followed by her seventh studio album, Gray Matterz, in 2015.

Albums

Studio albums

Collaboration albums

Compilation albums

Live albums

Extended plays

Singles

As featured artist

Promotional singles

Guest appearances

Music videos

Notes 
 a These early releases were under Detroit's birth name Marcy Levy.

References 

Discographies of American artists